Thok James (born 2 July 1994) is an Ethiopian footballer, who plays as a defender for CBE SA.

International career
In January 2014, coach Sewnet Bishaw, invited him to be a part of the Ethiopian squad for the 2014 African Nations Championship. The team was eliminated in the group stages after losing to Congo, Libya and Ghana.

References

External links
 

Living people
1994 births
Ethiopian footballers
Ethiopia international footballers
Ethiopian Coffee S.C. players
CBE SA players
Mekelle 70 Enderta F.C. players
Ethiopian Premier League players
Ethiopia A' international footballers
2014 African Nations Championship players
Association football defenders
People from Gambela Region